Black Throat is a 1985 interracial pornographic film directed by one-half of the Dark Brothers "purveyors of fine filth" team, Gregory Dark. It stars Peter North, Christy Canyon, Sahara, Craig Roberts, Purple Passion, Tony Martino, Kevin James, Erica Boyer, Marc Wallice, Lady Stephanie, and Steve Drake. Jack Baker stars in a non-sex role.

Traci Lords had the original "starring" credit in Black Throat, but her two scenes were removed when investigators discovered that she was underage at time of filming. Although her scenes were removed, her name remains in the theme music used at the start and end of the film.

Black Throat was recognized as XRCO Best Video of the Year in 1985. In 2005, it was inducted into the XRCO Hall of Fame.

Scene Breakdown

References

External links
 
 
 

1980s pornographic films
Interracial pornographic films
Films directed by Gregory Dark
1980s English-language films